St Michael and St George Cathedral may refer to:

 Cathedral of St Michael and St George, Aldershot, a Roman Catholic cathedral in England
 St Michael and St George Cathedral, Grahamstown, an Anglican cathedral in South Africa

See also
 Saint Michael and Saint George (disambiguation)
 Cathedral of Saint Michael (disambiguation)
 St. George's Cathedral (disambiguation)
 Saint Michael (disambiguation)
 Saint George (disambiguation)